Format Publications published Format magazine, a newsletter for ZX Spectrum and SAM Coupé users.

Run by Bob Brenchley, it sprang from the ashes of INDUG, originally the Independent DISCiPLE User Group but later renamed to the Independent User Group to reflect a move towards a less specialist audience. INDUG was set up as a user group for owners of the Miles Gordon Technology DISCiPLE and later PlusD floppy disk interfaces for the ZX Spectrum computer. In its later years it expanded to cover MGT's SAM Coupé enhanced Spectrum-compatible microcomputer and later still to home microcomputing in general - especially 8-bit machines.

External links
INDUG entry on "Speccy Usergroups" page

 the actual magazine

ZX Spectrum